Invitation is an album by American pianist Joanne Brackeen recorded in 1976 and originally released on the Freedom label before being rereleased as on CD on Black Lion in 1995.

Reception 

AllMusic reviewer Ken Dryden stated "Joanne Brackeen always keeps the listener guessing with her unpredictable style of playing piano, and this 1976 trio session is no exception".

Track listing
All compositions by Joanne Brackeen except where noted.
 "Six Ate" – 6:33
 "Echoes"- 8:57
 "Invitation" (Bronisław Kaper, Paul Francis Webster) – 8:02
 "Canyon Lady" (Mark Levine) – 9:58
 "Iris" (Wayne Shorter) – 6:58
 "C-Sri" – 8:25

Personnel
Joanne Brackeen – piano
Clint Houston – bass
Billy Hart – drums

References

Joanne Brackeen albums
1976 albums
Freedom Records albums
Black Lion Records albums